Henry Drury Hatfield (September 15, 1875 – October 23, 1962) was an American Republican politician from Logan County, West Virginia. He served a term as the 14th Governor of the state, in addition to one term in the United States Senate. Hatfield was nephew to Devil Anse Hatfield, leader of the Hatfield clan.

Hatfield was born in Logan County (present-day Mingo County, West Virginia) on September 15, 1875. He graduated from Franklin College in New Athens, Ohio. He later obtained medical degrees from what is now known as the University of Louisville and later from New York University. In 1895, he married South Carolina "Carrie" Bronson.

He was appointed as surgeon for the Norfolk and Western Railway (1895–1913) and surgeon in chief of State Hospital #1 in Welch, West Virginia (1899–1913). He entered local politics first as commissioner of district roads of McDowell County (1900–1905), eventually becoming a member of the State senate (1908–1912), and serving as president of the senate in 1911.

He was elected as Governor of West Virginia in 1912 when the southern coalfields were embroiled in the deadly Paint Creek–Cabin Creek strike. His predecessor, William E. Glasscock, had imposed martial law and imprisoned many striking miners. Hatfield began his term by pardoning Mother Jones and the miners who had been imprisoned by military courts, and then moving to negotiate a compromise to end the strike. He appointed a board of arbitration, and he himself chaired the board. The settlement presented to coal operators by Hatfield and the UMWA was staunchly opposed by local Socialists. In response, Hatfield deployed soldiers to force miners to agree to the compromise and ordered presses at Socialist newspapers in Huntington and Charleston destroyed. Following the expiration of his term in 1917, he entered the United States Army as a major in the Medical Corps, serving as chief of the Surgical Service at Base Hospital No. 36 in Detroit, Michigan.

He was discharged in 1919 and returned to West Virginia. In 1928, he was elected to the United States Senate as a Republican, and served from March 4, 1929 to January 3, 1935. He was defeated in a bid for reelection in 1934.

After leaving the Senate, Hatfield settled in Huntington, West Virginia and established a private medical practice, where he worked until his death in 1962.

References

External links

Biography of Henry D. Hatfield
Inaugural Address of Henry D. Hatfield
e-WV: The West Virginia Encyclopedia

1875 births
1962 deaths
People from Mingo County, West Virginia
Methodists from West Virginia
Republican Party governors of West Virginia
Politicians from Huntington, West Virginia
People from Welch, West Virginia
University of Louisville School of Medicine alumni
Republican Party United States senators from West Virginia
Military personnel from West Virginia
Physicians from West Virginia
Hatfield family
American surgeons
United States Army Medical Corps officers
United States Army personnel of World War I
New York University Grossman School of Medicine alumni
20th-century American politicians
Presidents of the West Virginia State Senate
Republican Party West Virginia state senators